Ferrithrix thermotolerans is a bacterium from the genus Ferrithrix which has been isolated from mineral samples from the Yellowstone National Park in the United States.

References

External links 
Type strain of Ferrithrix thermotolerans at BacDive -  the Bacterial Diversity Metadatabase

Actinomycetota
Bacteria described in 2009